Demolition Records was a British record label based in Jarrow, England, specialising in heavy metal and rock, with many international artists. It was founded in 2000 by brothers Ged and Eric Cook. There were also distribution offices in Frankfurt, Manhattan, and Tokyo.

In 2007, the label was later rumoured to be signing ZZ Top and Whitesnake, which would greatly increase their sales, but the rumours were quickly dismissed.

They also operated the sublabel DR2.

Roster
 Hanoi Rocks
 Lauren Harris
 Glenn Hughes
 McQueen
 Painmuseum
 Quiet Riot
 The Quireboys
 David Lee Roth
 Sacred Sin
 Skyclad
 The Sound Ex
 Spike
 Temple of Brutality
 Tigertailz (from 2006)
 Therapy?
 Twisted Sister
 Vixen
 W.A.S.P.
 Y&T

See also
 List of record labels

References

External links
 Demolition Records US Official MySpace Page
 Demolition Records at discogs

British record labels
Rock record labels